Parinya Saenkhammuen (born 1 September 1983) is a Thai Association Football center back. He plays for Thai Premier League club Pattaya United.
He was voted the best defender in the 2010 Thai Division 1 League whilst playing for Air Force United F.C.
His Thai nickname is "Joe."

Clubs

Air Force United F.C.
Pattaya United F.C.

See also
Football in Thailand
List of football clubs in Thailand

External links
http://www.airforceunited.com/players/p08.html
https://web.archive.org/web/20120430012529/http://www.thaipremierleague.co.th/news_detail.php?nid=00216

1983 births
Living people
Parinya Saenkhammuen
Association football defenders
Parinya Saenkhammuen